Milišić's brickyard was one of four concentration camps in Belgrade in occupied Serbia during World War II. Several thousand people were imprisoned in Milišić's brickyard, mostly partisans from Dalmatia and Bosnia, and around 500 of them died in this concentration camp.

References 

Serbia under German occupation
Nazi concentration camps in Yugoslavia
Nazi war crimes in Serbia
1940s in Belgrade